Lucien Louis Daniel (1 November 1856 – 26 December 1940) was a French botanist. He was a professor of applied botany at the University of Rennes. His speciality was grafting.

He is the binomial author of a plant species in the family Rosaceae: Pirocydonia winkleri L.L.Daniel ex Bois, an asexual artificial hybrid. (Revue Horticole. Paris. 1914, n. s. xiv. 27)

In 1904 he was awarded the Veitch Memorial Medal by the Royal Horticultural Society.

Selected works
(1902) La Théorie des Capacités Fonctionnelles et ses Conséquences en Agriculture  [The Theory of the Functional Capacities in Agriculture and Its Consequences]
(1904) Premières Notes sur la Reconstitution du Vignoble Français par le Greffage  [First Notes on the Restoration of French Vineyards by Grafting]
(1908) La Question phylloxérique: Le Greffage Et la Crise Viticole  [The Phylloxera Question: Grafting and the Wine Crisis] (see: Great French Wine Blight)
( 1911) L'Hérédité chez le Haricot Vivace  [Heredity in the Perennial Bean]
(1925) Nouvelles Observations sur les Hybrides de Greffe et l'Hérédité chez les Plantes Greffées  [New Observations on the Grafted Hybrids and Inheritance in Grafted Plants]
(1929) La Culture de la Vigne en Bretagne: Son Histoire, son État Actuel et son Avenir  [Culture of the Vine in Britain: Its History, Current State and Future]
(1940) Les Mystères de L'hérédité Symbiotique. Points Névralgiques Scientifiques. Pensées, Théories Et Faits Biologiques  [The Mysteries of Symbiotic Heredity. Scientific hotspots. Thoughts, Theories and Facts Organic]

References

1856 births
1940 deaths
19th-century French botanists
Veitch Memorial Medal recipients
20th-century French botanists